Charles Wyplosz (born 5 September 1947 in Vichy, France) is a French economist. He is an editor of the International Centre for Economic Policy Research's VoxEU and is currently the director of the International Centre for Monetary and Banking Studies (ICMB) and Professor of International Economics at the Graduate Institute in Geneva, Switzerland.  He was a founding managing editor of Economic Policy.

Education
 Engineering Degree from Ecole Centrale Paris, 1970
 Institut Supérieur de Statistiques des Universités de Paris, Certificat Supérieur d'Études, 1972
 PhD in Economics from Harvard University, 1978

Career
From 1978 until 1996 he was assistant professor of economics and associate dean at INSEAD and during the period 1986–1996 he was professor at the École des Hautes Études en Sciences Sociales. Since 1995 he is Professor of Economics at the Graduate Institute of International and Development Studies in Geneva.

He has been editor of Economic Policy since 1984. He has served as advisor to various governments (Russia, Cyprus, France) as well as to numerous organisations such the IMF, the World Bank, the European Commission, the European Parliament, the Asian Development Bank. He served as Director of the International Macroeconomics Programme at the Centre for Economic Policy Research (CEPR).

His areas of research are macroeconomics, exchange rates and the labor market. He has worked extensively on money especially the European Monetary System, the Economic and Monetary Union of the European Union, financial crisis, and capital mobility and economic transformation of former communist economies.

He has been awarded the Legion d’Honneur by the President of France.

Selected publications
 Macroeconomics: a European Text by Michael C. Burda and Charles Wyplosz (Oxford UP, 6th ed 2013 )
 The Economics of European Integration by Richard E. Baldwin and Charles Wyplosz (McGraw Hill, 2nd ed 2006))

References

External links
 Profile at The Graduate Institute
 Personal website

Living people
French economists
1947 births
People from Vichy
Harvard Graduate School of Arts and Sciences alumni
École Centrale Paris alumni
Academic staff of the Graduate Institute of International and Development Studies
Academic staff of the School for Advanced Studies in the Social Sciences